Notable Military personnel of Sri Lanka

 Sarath Fonseka    
 John Kotelawala 
 Jagath Jayasuriya 
 Shavendra Silva   
 Denzil Kobbekaduwa   
 Rohan Daluwatte 
 Gamini Kularatne 
 Lalith Jayasinghe

List of Sri Lankan generals

Commander of the Army (Sri Lanka)

Commander of the Navy (Sri Lanka)

Commander of the Air Force (Sri Lanka)

Lists of Sri Lankan people